Blood Lust is an EP recorded from 1982 to 1983.  This red 7" vinyl EP includes a 3-second intro followed by 10 songs with an average length of 58 seconds for a total play time of 10:41.

The Bergen County borough of Lodi, NJ was the spawning ground for hardcore punk band Rosemary's Babies.  In 1980 when the band formed, the  town had an effective population of 24,000 where the local high school produced other musical talents such as Danzig and The Misfits.

In 2004, Blood Lust was re-mastered and re-released as Talking to the Dead under the same band and label names.  This second release extended the play time to 38 minutes with the addition twelve new songs plus five tracks recorded live at CBGB in New York City. The only song not included here is 26 second Sanctioned Violence, which was re-recorded with a run time of 2:29 and released on the album CAGED in 2008 when band front man and vocalist J.R. joined Septimus Orion.

Track listing 
 "unlisted intro" (dialogue from the Lost In Space TV series) — 0.03
 "Blood Lust" (C.A. Richie/Eerie Von) — 0.39
 "I'm Gonna Be Sick" (Post Mortem/Eerie Von) — 1.14
 "Happy Song" (Post Mortem/C.A.Richie/Eerie Von) — 1.50
 "Inferior" (C.A. Richie/Eerie Von) — 1.43
 "Small Minds, Think Small" (Post Mortem/C.A.Richie/Eerie Von) — 0.51
 "Talking To The Dead" (Rosemary's Babies) — 1.01
 "Sanctioned Violence" (J.R.) — 0.26
 "Let's Molest 10yr. Olds" (Rosemary's Babies) — 1.27
 "One Dead Low-Life" (Post Mortem/Eerie Von) — 0.33
 "That's Alright, That's O.K." (C.A. Richie/Eerie Von) — 0.54

Credits 
J. R. – vocals
Post Mortem – bass guitar
C.A. Richie – lead guitar
Eerie Von – drums

1983 EPs
Rosemary's Babies albums